Boccette is a billiards-type game played in Italy. A variation of the game of five-pins, it is played on a less (carom) billiard table with nine balls (typically four white, four red, and one blue). Cue sticks are not used; the balls are manipulated with the hands directly.

Finger billiards